is the 11th studio album by Japanese idol duo Wink, released by Polystar on November 26, 1993. It features the single "Sakihokore Itoshisa yo". Also included in the album are Japanese-language covers of Bananarama's "Movin' On" and Foreigner's "I Want to Know What Love Is". Brunch was the first album since Moonlight Serenade to not involve songwriting by Neko Oikawa.

The album peaked at No. 31 on Oricon's albums chart and sold over 26,000 copies.

Track listing

Charts

References

External links 
 
 
 

1993 albums
Wink (duo) albums
Japanese-language albums